Ejnar Dyggve (17 October 1887 in Liepāja, Russian Empire - 6 August 1961 in Copenhagen) was a Danish architect and archeologist. He worked extensively on Balkan architecture starting in 1922 during an expedition to Salona in Dalmatia.

References

Danish architects
1887 births
1961 deaths
Emigrants from the Russian Empire to Denmark